The action of 26 June 1625 was the battle that took place on 26 June 1625 near Syracuse, Sicily, when 6 Bizertan vessels defeated 5 Maltese galleys.

Ships involved

Bizerta
2 galleys (formerly Spanish, captured in 1624)
4 other vessels

Malta
San Giovanni - Captured
San Francesco - Captured
3 other galleys

References
 

Conflicts in 1625
1625
1625
1625 in Africa
1625 in the Ottoman Empire